KIXW-FM is a commercial radio station in Lenwood, California, broadcasting to the eastern section of the Victor Valley area on 107.3 FM. It is simulcast on KIXF 101.5 FM in Baker, California.  The stations share a Country format.

The stations are branded as "Highway Country 107.3 & 101.5" and its target audience consists of travelers on Interstate 15 between Los Angeles and Las Vegas.

The call signs of the stations were once unified together with a third station with KIXA (Apple Valley) to broadcast the now defunct Rock 106.5 across Lenwood, Baker and Barstow in 1998. After Rock 106.5 was shut down in 2002, Clear Channel sold off the repeater stations to Heftel Broadcasting, and relaunched KIXA as The Fox 106 (Classic Rock).

Repeater

See also
 The Highway Drive
 The Highway Vibe

External links

IXW
Country radio stations in the United States
Mass media in San Bernardino County, California
Victor Valley
Radio stations established in 1993
1993 establishments in California